Trujillo is a city in coastal northwestern Peru and the capital of the Department of La Libertad. It is the third most populous city and center of the third most populous metropolitan area of Peru. It is located on the banks of the Moche River, near its mouth at the Pacific Ocean, in the Moche Valley. This was a site of the great prehistoric Moche and Chimu cultures before the Inca conquest and subsequent expansion.

The Independence of Trujillo from Spain was proclaimed in the Historic Centre of Trujillo on December 29, 1820, and the city was honored in 1822 by the Congress of the Republic of Peru with the title "Meritorious City and Faithful to the Fatherland", for its role in the fight for Peruvian independence. Trujillo is the birthplace of Peru's judiciary, and it was twice designated as the capital of the country. It was the scene of the Revolution of Trujillo in 1932. Trujillo is considered the "cradle of liberty and cradle of the judiciary in Peru".

Trujillo is also known as the "City of Everlasting Spring", is considered the "Capital of the Marinera", a traditional dance in Peru, "Cradle of the Peruvian Paso horse", as well as the "Capital of Culture of Peru". It has sponsored numerous national and international cultural events, and has a lively arts community. Current festivals include the "National Marinera Festival", the Trujillo Spring Festival and the International Book Festival, which is one of the most important cultural events in the country.

Trujillo is close to two major archeological sites of pre-Columbian monuments: Chan Chan, the largest adobe city in the ancient world, designated a World Heritage Site by UNESCO in 1986; and the temples of the Sun and Moon (the largest adobe pyramid in Peru).

The city center contains many examples of colonial and religious architecture, often incorporating distinctive wrought ironwork. It includes residential areas, a central business district, and industrial supply distribution to the various districts. The Roman Catholic Archdiocese of Trujillo has its seat here. Roman Catholicism is the predominant religion and 10 colonial churches are located within the old city wall, now encircled by Avenida España; additional churches in the towns of Huamán, Huanchaco and Moche are located within  of Trujillo's centre.

Since 2011, the city has been developing the pilot project Trujillo: Sustainable City, as part of the platform "Emerging and Sustainable Cities of the Inter-American Development Bank", in cooperation with the IDB. In 2012 Trujillo was selected by IBM to participate in a "Smarter Cities Challenge" project intended to improve public safety and transportation through technology.

Identity

Capital of culture
Trujillo is considered the "Capital of Culture of Peru" for the prominent writers associated with the city such as Cesar Vallejo and Víctor Raúl Haya de la Torre, and because the city is a center for important cultural expressions as the marinera dance, Peruvian paso horses, caballitos de totora, Trujillo's gastronomy, etc. The North Group was formed here, with Eduardo González Viaña and Gerardo Chavez as successors. The city presents important national festivals, such as Marinera Festival, Spring Festival, and competitions for the paso horse and caballito de totora.

Symbols

Coat of arms
The coat of arms of the city was awarded on December 7, 1537, by Royal Decree issued by the King of Spain, Charles V. The shield consists of two columns rising from water, a king's crown on top surrounded by pearls and precious stones and two staffs that surround the letter K (for Karolus, royal cypher of the King); and on the back is a black griffin facing right and supporting the shield.

Flag
The flag is the coat of arms on a white background; it is carried during the official ceremonies of the Municipality of Trujillo in the main square of the city. Also it is flown every December 29 to commemorate the proclamation of independence of Trujillo in 1820.

Anthem
The anthem was written by Ramiro Mendoza Sánchez with music composed by Ramiro Herrera Orbegoso. It is performed mainly for official civic ceremonies, by bands of musicians.

History
The history of Trujillo has its beginning in ancient times, as the area at the mouth of the Moche River was long a center of successive pre-European cultures. They extended their domains along the northern coast of Peru.

Pre-Columbian era

The archaeological history of this region goes back to the early pre-ceramic period. For example, Huaca Prieta was occupied as early as 4700 BC.

Several ancient cultures developed in this area: the Cupisnique, the Moche and Chimu. Numerous archaeological sites and monumental remains attest to the high degree of complexity of these civilizations.

Among the Cupisnique culture sites are Caballo Muerto and Huaca Prieta.

The Moche culture sites include huacas: the Temples of the Sun and Moon south of the city, the Huaca del Dragón (or Rainbow Huaca) and the Huaca Esmeralda to the north, and others.

The Chimu culture built its primary settlement at what is known as Chan Chan, which was the capital, having an estimated 100,000 people at its peak. It is the largest pre-Columbian city built of adobe and has been designated a UNESCO World Heritage Site. The present Spanish–Peruvian city of Trujillo was founded in an ancestral territory populated by ancient indigenous civilizations. The Spanish founded new cities expressing their culture in what they called the "Viceroyalty of Peru".

Moche civilization

The Moche civilization flourished in northern Peru with its Huacas del Sol y de la Luna from about AD 100 to 800, during the Regional Development Epoch. The people likely had formed into a group of autonomous polities that shared a common elite culture, as seen in the rich iconography and monumental architecture that survive today. They are particularly noted for their elaborately-painted ceramics, gold work, monumental constructions (huacas) and irrigation systems.

Moche history is broadly divided into three periods – the emergence of the Moche culture in the Early Moche (AD 100–300), its expansion and florescence during the Middle Moche (300–600), and the urban nucleation and subsequent collapse in the Late Moche (500–750). Moche society was agriculture-based, and the cultural leaders invested in the construction of a network of irrigation canals for the diversion of river water to supply the crops. Their culture was sophisticated; and their artifacts fully express their lives, including scenes of hunting, fishing, fighting, sacrifice, elaborate ceremonies, and sexual acts.

Chimu Empire

The Chimu built and occupied a territory known as Chimor, with its capital at the city of Chan Chan, a large adobe city in the Valley of Moche (around which present-day Trujillo city developed). The culture arose about 900 and flourished into the 14th century. The Inca ruler Tupac Inca Yupanqui led a campaign which conquered the Chimu in around 1470.

This was just 50 years before the arrival of the Spanish in the region. Consequently, Spanish chroniclers recorded accounts of Chimu culture from persons who had lived before the Inca conquest. Similarly, archaeological evidence suggest Chimor emerged from the remnants of Moche culture; early Chimu pottery had some resemblance to that of the Moche. Their ceramics are all-black, and their work in precious metals is very detailed and intricate. In the Late Chimu period, about 12,000 artisans lived and worked in Chan Chan alone. They engaged in fishing, agriculture, craft work, and trade. Artisans were forbidden to change their profession, and were grouped together in the citadel according to their area of specialization. Archeologists have noted a dramatic rise in the volume of Chimu craft production, which they attribute to artisans having been brought to Chan Chan from another area taken in conquest. As there is evidence of both metalwork (generally a male specialty) and weaving (a female art) in the same domestic dwelling, it is likely that both men and women were artisans. The men engaged in fishing, heavy agriculture (aided by irrigation and earthworks), and metallurgy. The women made ceramics and textiles (from spun and dyed cotton, llama, alpaca, and vicuña wool). People used reed fishing canoes, hunted, and traded using bronze coins.

In May 2018 archaeologists uncovered the world’s largest child-sacrifice site at Trujillo. National Geographic reported that more than 140 children and 200 baby llamas appeared to have been ritually sacrificed, more than 500 years ago.

Colonial era

Spanish foundation

Trujillo was one of the first cities in the Americas founded by the Spanish conquistadors. They arrived in an area that had been inhabited and developed for thousands of years by the indigenous peoples. According to historian Napoleón Cieza Burga, the conquistador Diego de Almagro founded the first settlement in November 1534, calling it Trujillo of New Castile after Trujillo, the home city of Francisco Pizarro. It was founded among four Chimu settlements: Huanchaco, Huamán, Moche and Mampuesto, to create an alliance against the Incas. On November 23, 1537, King Charles I of Spain gave the town the rank of 'city' and the coat of arms that remains a symbol for the city; it was the first city in Peru to receive a coat of arms from the king. By 1544 Trujillo had around 300 homes and 1,000 inhabitants, and an economy booming from the cultivation of sugar cane, wheat, and other food crops and the raising of livestock.

The Spanish colonists welcomed a diverse array of religious orders from the time of its founding, and there was a boom in church construction in the city during the 16th and 17th centuries. In 1577 Pope Gregory XIII created the Diocese of Trujillo, and in 1616 construction work commenced on the cathedral.

On February 14, 1619, Trujillo was struck by an earthquake, resulting in the near-total destruction of the city and the deaths of around 400 of its inhabitants. Rebuilding was slow. The people developed a devotion to Saint Valentine, on whose day the earthquake hit. The Jesuits opened a seminary and school for the education and training of priests; they also served as missionaries to the indigenous peoples, as they introduced Christianity.

17th century

The Wall of Trujillo

This wall was built by an Italian architect, Giuseppe Formento, who began construction on February 19, 1687. Formento based his design on that by Leonardo da Vinci for the Italian city of Florence. The wall was designed in an elliptical shape to save costs in its construction, and was completed in 1689. The defensive structure was composed of 15 bastions, 15 shades and 5 covered gates.

The Huamán Gate was oriented westward to the road to the village of the same name. The Mansiche Gate was located to the north, giving way to the highway. The Miraflores Gate opened to the east. The Sierra Gate was named after the road leading to this region. Lastly, the Moche Gate gave access to people coming from the south. In 1942 the city developed a master plan; following the path of the ancient wall, it built Avenida España to encircle the area now called the Historical Center of Trujillo.

In the latter half of the 17th century, severe droughts and pestilence caused a major economic crisis for the city, which depended on agriculture. Trujillo regained prominence in the 18th century, in part due to the destruction of the city of Saña by flooding in 1720. Trujillo also suffered from flooding in 1701, 1720, 1728 and 1814; and earthquakes in 1725 and 1759.

By 1760 an estimated 9,200 people were living in the vicinity of the city. The foundation of the Municipality of Trujillo in 1779 coincided with a peak of prosperity for the city. Numerous undeveloped lots remained within the city walls but Trujillo was regarded as one of the most important cities in Northern Peru during the colonial era.

Independence

Inspired by liberal ideas from members of its educational institutions, Trujillo became a principal centre of Peruvian republican sentiments. Led by the city mayor and intendant José Bernardo de Tagle, the Intendancy of Trujillo declared its independence from Spain on December 29, 1820.

Between 1821 and 1825 the Trujillo region was the only stable and productive land within the nascent republic. In 1823 Trujillo took on the role of the first capital city of the Republic of Peru. On July 19, 1823, the Peruvian Congress located here repeated its invitation to Simón Bolívar, a leader in Bolivia, to join the war of independence. In 1824 the city received the liberation army of Bolívar, and was again designated as the seat of government. It is the only city to have twice been designated as the capital.

The years following the revolution saw the growth in the economic influence of the city, compensating for a loss of political power to Lima when it was designated as the capital, which instead suffered from the resulting political turmoil. The Moche and Chicama valleys emerged as new economic enclaves for the sugar cane industry. Land was increasingly concentrated in large estates and a new "agricultural aristocracy" developed that was linked to and influenced national political power. The policy of free trade and openness to foreign investment attracted an influx of Europeans, principally from Britain and Germany. By then, Trujillo had a population of 15,000 and began to grow beyond the city walls. New architectural styles were adopted, influenced by French and English Romanticism.

During the War of the Pacific against Chile between 1879 and 1883, Trujillo contributed troops towards national defence. Although never a site of battle, Trujillo suffered from occupation by Chilean troops and their plundering of the surrounding countryside.

First Independent City of Peru

It is considered the "First Independent City of Peru" for three reasons: it proclaimed independence from Spain on December 24, 1820 at the historical "Casa de la Emancipación" (House of Emancipation). Its leaders signed the declaration of independence at the Seminario de San Carlos y San Marcelo and proclaimed independence to an open council meeting in the Plaza de Armas, on December 29, 1820. Finally, on January 6, 1821, its leaders ratified the agreement and the proclamation of the independence of this city, as stated in the document called Libro rojo (the Red Book) of the Trujillo council.

Their actions gained independence for almost all of northern Peru, because the government of Trujillo city ruled what is now the regions of Tumbes, Piura, Lambayeque, La Libertad, Cajamarca, San Martín and Amazonas. Marquis of Torre Tagle said, "My people. From this time for the unanimous will of the people, Trujillo is free. I put our fate and that of people under the protection of Heaven! Long live the homeland! Long live independence!"

Republican era

The Provisional Regulations given by General San Martín in 1821 created the Department of Trujillo, based on colonial administration. This status was acknowledged in the first Constitution of Peru in 1823. Because of its size and economic wealth, the Department of Trujillo between 1821 and 1825 was the only stable and productive area that could organize and lead the nascent republic. The department encompassed nearly half the country. For the efforts of its people in the war of emancipation, San Martín gave it the title of "Meritorious City Loyal to the Homeland". The municipality of the city, then called a cabildo, was given the rank of "honorable".

In 1823, after the creation of the Republic of Peru, the protectorate of José de San Martín was developed. Before royal troops took the city of Lima, the first President of Peru, Don José de la Riva Agüero, together with Sánchez Carrión, named Trujillo as provisional capital of the country, which survived for a short period.

In 1824 the city received the liberation army of Simón Bolívar. Taking over the government of the country, he established a temporary government of the country in Trujillo, on March 8, 1824.

In 1821 the Court of Appeals was created to replace the Royal Court. Its jurisdiction extended over the present departments of Cajamarca, Piura, Lambayeque, Amazonas (then known as the Chachapoyas), and Huamachuco (then known as Sánchez Carrión). On March 26, 1824 Simón Bolívar established Trujillo's first Superior Court of Justice as the Northern Superior Court. It had been the first high court established in the Republic of Peru with the powers of the Supreme Court.

19th century
By the end of the 19th century the five entrances had disappeared from the city, so it was that during this time the Wall of Trujillo was torn down and allowed the growth of the city. This urban expansion allowed the establishment of the neighborhoods of Chicago, La Unión and Pedro Muñiz. During the administration of Don Víctor Larco Herrera as mayor, the city began upgrading works such as the construction of City Hall, the arrangement and embellishment of the Plaza de Armas and the atrium of the Cathedral. It also built the road to the resort of Buenos Aires, which expanded the city urban planning perspective. Another project was the renovation of the Municipal Theater.

20th century

In July 1932, Trujillo was once again at the centre of one of the most important episodes in the history of the Republic of Peru, the Trujillo Revolution of 1932, which cost the lives of many citizens. Although this year came to be known as the "year of barbarism", it would also mark the political identity of the city during the second half of the 20th century.

The latter half of the 20th century saw the expansion of the city due to a combination of rural-to-urban migration and the consolidation of surrounding districts into the Trujillo metropolitan area.

From 1980 Trujillo took on the aspect and behavior of a particularly dynamic metropolitan area, by which time the growth of the city and adjoining districts had produced a single metropolitan area, so in the 1980s the nascent Trujillo metropolitan area consisted of the integrated urban districts of Trujillo, El Porvenir and Florencia de Mora, with Víctor Larco Herrera and La Esperanza remaining discontinuous districts. In 1981 the city had 403,337 inhabitants. Also in the 1980s the Trujillo Industrial Park project was begun, located on the north side of the city, in the present La Esperanza district.

With the advent of the 1990s, the city of Trujillo was unified with the districts of La Esperanza and Victor Larco Herrera and the spread of the city resulted in the districts of Moche, Trujillo, Salaverry, and Laredo becoming part of the metropolitan area. In the first half of the 1990s, after the emergence of the El Milagro area in Huanchaco, it was joined to La Esperanza district, and increasing interdependence with the districts of Moche and Laredo, which was cemented Trujillo as a new metropolis of Peru, then with a population of 589,314 inhabitants.

21st century

Modernization of the city
With the experience of the last two decades of the 20th century, when the city experienced an excessive disordered growth while increasing the costs for providing basic services to the population, the Provincial Municipality of Trujillo created the Trujillo Metropolitan Development Plan 2010, known as "Plandemetru", which was approved by city ordinance on November 30, 1995. Through this was planned the growth and development of the city up to 2010; later the lines of development of the metropolis were governed by the "Strategic Plan for Integral Development and Sustainable Trujillo till 2015" containing general guidelines for the development of the city by 2015.

Sustainable and smart city

In November 2010, Trujillo was the first city in Latin America and the Caribbean to be chosen by the Inter-American Development Bank (IDB) to develop the pilot "Sustainable City" project as part of the platform "Emerging and Sustainable Cities of the Inter-American Development Bank". This project includes a plan of action on climate change, which will be held on emissions limits in Trujillo, and will review the list of investment projects with respect to climate sustainability. According to IDB representative Fidel Jaramillo, Trujillo was chosen as the first driver of progress in Latin America to develop a new initiative. Trujillo's plan is to conceive from other perspectives such as fiscal and financial sustainability, which is basic, but also from environmental sustainability and quality of life. The IDB is developing relevant projects in coordination with the Provincial Municipality of Trujillo. In 2012 Trujillo began to develop, with the support of American technology corporation IBM, the "Smart City" project, which will try to focus technologically on the two problems of public safety and transportation.

Geography

Location

Climate
This city has a desert climate (BWh, according to the Köppen climate classification) and it is known as La Ciudad de la Eterna Primavera (city of everlasting spring) because of its sunny and pleasant weather year-round. The International Spring Festival in early October attracts visitors from all over Peru and the world. The city is in an area of mild climate and low rainfall, with moderate temperatures ranging between  due to the Humboldt Current.
Trujillo has a warm climate during the day and mild during the night due to the sea breeze. Rains are light, sporadic and occur during the afternoon or evening. The Andes and their foothills are very close to the coast, and having a lower elevation relative to the mountains of central and southern Peru, the flow of moist air from the Amazon region, which converges with the sea breezes from the west, favors during the summer a higher frequency of light showers. According to the climate classification of Thornthwaite, city of Trujillo would correspond to an arid climate type with no rain during all seasons.

The parts of the city closest to the sea experience haze during the morning and usually the temperature is lower than in the central and upper parts of the city. However, during the phenomenon of El Niño the climate varies, mainly the rainfall, with less intensity than in regions located north of the city, and the temperature can also be lifted.

Hydrography
Trujillo is crossed by the Moche River that passes to the south of the city; its waters have been used since ancient times by the Moche and Chimu who inhabited this area, who took its waters to irrigate their fields; today the river is part of the countryside of Moche and its waters continue to be used for irrigation. The river empties into the Pacific Ocean right on the boundary between the districts of Moche and Víctor Larco Herrera.

Physiography
Trujillo is set on a coastal plain of the La Libertad Region and has a gentle topography with hilly terrain, sitting on a plateau of the Trujillo Province. The low-lying areas of the city are very close to the Pacific Ocean and the higher elevations are close to the Andean foothills.

Demographics

2007 census
About the spatial distribution of the population of the city and the urban continuum of Trujillo in 2007, there are two positions:

According to the report "Sociodemographic Profile" issued by the INEI In 2007, the city had a population of up to 682,834 people, with an annual average growth rate of 2.1%; According to the report "Peru: Recent Internal Migration and Cities System 2001 – 2007", in 2007 the figure was 709,566 inhabitants.

Moreover, considering the studies of urban development of the "PLANDET", the city is formed by the five districts that make up the conurbation of the districts of Trujillo, La Esperanza, El Porvenir, Florencia de Mora and Victor Larco Herrera in addition these also the minor municipality called "El Milagro" in the jurisdiction of Huanchaco district, which make up the urban continuum of Trujillo city; and the urban area known as "Trujillo Metropolitano" comprises the urban continuum and the urban and rural towns of the districts of the metropolitan area including such as are Huanchaco, Laredo, Moche and Salaverry.

In recent decades, urban growth is largely due to Trujillo population increase of migrant origin, the main contributors of population (1993 census), the interior provinces of La Libertad as Otuzco (15.8%), Santiago de Chuco (9.3%), Ascope (9%) and Sánchez Carrión (5.2%), while 16% contributed Cajamarca and Ancash with 5%;

In the following table is shown the population of Trujillo Metropolitan distributed by districts:

 Graphics of the population.
A comparison Chart of the city and metropolitan population of Trujillo, in the bars in green color It is shown the evolution of the population of the city and the blue bars show the population of Trujillo metropolitan. According to INEI in 2014 Trujillo metropolitan, with a population of 935,147 people is Peru's second largest metropolis by population.

Religion
In the city the predominant religion is Christianity, inherited from the Spanish culture since colonial era. In this topic there are different congregations that profess the Christian faith as the Catholic Church, Jehovah's Witnesses, The Church of Jesus Christ of Latter-day Saints (LDS Church), the Pentecostal Church, etc. All these Christian congregations have their temples in different parts of the city. In the historical center of Trujillo dominates the existence of temples of the Catholic Church such as the cathedral city located in the Plaza de Armas of Trujillo. One of the most representative events of Christianity in the city organized by the Catholic Church each year is Corpus Christi which gathers a large number of Christians in the Plaza Mayor of the city. About the Catholicism is the predominant Church in the districts that make up the city, according to census data in 2007. In the city, 76.9% of the population over 12 years is Catholic, 15.1% is Protestant, 3.9% other churches, and 4.1% is not linked to any church of a universe of 541,056 people.

Economy

In the 19th century, the city of Trujillo greatly expanded due to extensive irrigated agriculture, with high production and profits from the sugarcane industry. Today, asparagus and shoes are some of the main products of its metropolitan area. The irrigated lands of the Moche River Valley produce sugarcane, rice, and asparagus. Industries in the city include the sugar refineries, knitting mills, breweries and the shoe industry. Among the internationally known products of Trujillo, asparagus is exported to neighboring countries, Europe and the United States. The areas around Trujillo are among the largest exporters of white asparagus in the world. Peru is the world’s leading exporter of asparagus, followed by China and Mexico.

Trujillo is the most important economic center of northern Peru; it is an inland commercial and transport center for the surrounding farming areas. Its numerous shopping malls, supermarkets, department stores, and similar amenities make Trujillo a modern city.

In recent years another important economic sector in the city is the construction industry. According to statistical information provided by the "Institute of Construction and Development of the Peruvian Chamber of Construction" between 2006 and May 2012 construction activity in Trujillo grew by 500%. The study reveals that in 2006 were built 92770 m2 and the first months of 2012 the figure rose to 437440 m2, mainly due to the increased amount of square meters per house, likewise states that the total built in so far this year, 84% is housing construction.

Agro Industry
Trujillo is an agricultural, commercial and transport center due to production areas that account. The expansion of irrigated agriculture caused an expansive growth in the city, especially agribusiness sugar cane, which had as its ultimate expression in the Agricultural Cooperative Sugar Casa Grande (Casa Grande today Agroindustirial Company SA).

Among its most popular products internationally, highlighting the studs that are exported mainly to neighboring countries, USA, Europe. The momentum that has been taking the "Special Project Chavimochic" which includes the irrigation of the valleys of Chao, Viru, Moche, and later will include Chicama, has managed the successful export of many agricultural and agroindustrial products, which include artichokes, peppers, avocado, mango, etc.

Chavimochic
Chavimochic Special Project is a work of hydraulic engineering, this irrigation system extends throughout much of the coast of the La Libertad Region, on the north coast of Peru, it is designed to irrigate the valleys of Chao, Viru, Moche and Chicama. In 2012 It is already advanced up to its second stage in Moche valley.

Leather and footwear
It consists of the shoe makers and other leather products. It is classified within the manufacturing sector and is composed of micro and small enterprises, characterized by abundant labor demand and intermediate goods. Formally registered in 1300 small and medium enterprises (SMEs), which provide a significant 11% to the sector. They have achieved to sell their products domestically and characterize Trujillo as a shoe manufacturer city . Has the distinction of having formed a business cluster that provides its own dynamic of production and marketing. Spatially, 53% of SMEs are located in the district of El Porvenir. Trujillo concentrates 24% of the activity, and finally La Esperanza and Florencia de Mora concentrated 10% each. Tanning SMEs are preferentially located in the bottom of La Esperanza.

Commerce
The city has the largest commercial activity in the region motivated mainly by agribusiness, footwear industry, metal engineering, education, etc. Some of the main retail centers in the city are:

 Real Plaza
 Mall Aventura Plaza
 Open Plaza Los Jardines
 Penta Mall Mansiche
 Boulevard Primavera
 El Virrey
 Zona Franca
 Apiat

Some brands of Trujillo city

According to a study published in 2010 by the magazine Peru Económico some of the most representative brands of Trujillo and that have regional impact are:
Trujillo, is a pilsener beer brand created in the beginnings of the 20th century. Later the company Backus and Johnston acquired the rights to this brand.
Cassinelli, is a trademark of beverages of the company Enrique Cassinelli and Sons SAC, who also manufactures the brand Liber.
Embutidos Razzeto, the brand is a company of meat and sausage has one of the largest industrial plants in the country.
Caja Trujillo, is a trademark of the largest financial company locally providing financial attention mainly to small and medium entrepreneurs in the SME sector.
Dulcería Castañeda, this is a traditional brand of candy with a product called "Alfajor Castañeda" before known as Alfajor de Trujillo.
GN, is a brand of biscuits.
Jano’s, is a brand of fast food in the city.
UCV, it is the brand of the largest consortium of universities, the Cesar Vallejo University has its headquarters in Victor Larco district.
Transportes Linea, is a brand of passenger transportation.
Transportes Rodrigo Carranza (TRC) is a heavy load transportation company, with "TRC Express" providing passenger transportation services. Its main base is located south of the city in Moche district and has branches in different cities of the country.

Government

Regional government
Trujillo is the capital of La Libertad region as such is the seat of regional government and its technical organs of government line as are the regional offices of the scope of its jurisdiction, so the regional policies of this government are deployed from this city for use in its territory corresponding. The city also hosts various regional directorates of the ministries that make up the country's public administration. Trujillo is also headquarters of the III-Territorial Police Directorate, as executing agency for the National Police of Peru.

Local government

The city, capital of La Libertad Region and the Province of Trujillo, is governed by the Provincial Municipality of Trujillo, which is governed by the provisions of the organic law of municipalities and that it has jurisdiction throughout the province . There is limited authority to the city and there is no governing body of the city itself, in that sense, the municipalities of the metropolitan districts that make up the city have jurisdiction in matters relating to their own districts.

Political system

The city is governed by a provincial mayor elected by popular vote every four years. The mayor is responsible for the municipal public administration and community, is the political representative of the municipality of the city and has political influences at the provincial level, so the guidelines of their policies are aimed primarily at the territorial level.

Judicial system

Trujillo is home to the Superior Court of La Libertad, that was the first Superior Court of Justice established in the country during the government of Simon Bolivar on March 26, 1824, under the name of Superior Court of North. Is the governing body of the Judicial District of La Libertad. According to Peru's judicial system. The city has the highest judicial burden of the region La Libertad.

Tourism

Tourism is a major industry in Trujillo due to the city's proximity to important sites where the Moche and Chimu civilizations evolved. These civilizations had highly skilled artisans, and many of their artifacts having been found during archaeological digs in the city.
Nearby ruins include the Chimu adobe city of Chan Chan, the world's largest city built from that material. It is sometimes called Ciudad de la Luna (City of the Moon) because the people worshipped the moon; or de las Largas Murallas (of the Long Walls). In size and complexity, it has been compared with Teotihuacan in Mexico, and the ancient cities of Egypt. Other nearby ruins are the Moche ruins of Huaca del Sol, Huaca de la Luna, Huaca del Dragón o Arco Iris, Huaca Esmeralda and El Brujo.

Trujillo aspires to be designated a World Heritage Site, because of the proximity of both cultures and its historical colonial city centre, whose historic casonas (mansions) attract many visitors. The mansions and manors of Trujillo are distinguished for their solemn and austere façades. Inside, their halls are overflowing with ornaments.

Trujillo's wrought-iron window railings are a unique feature of the mansions. The House of Ganoza-Chopitea (casa Ganoza) has a polychromatic front in the baroque style, crowned by a rococo frontispiece and two lions. It is the city's most representative example of casonas architecture. Another is the House of Mayorazgo, which was built in the early years of the city and holds one of Peru's greatest numismatic collections. The revolutionary leader Simón Bolívar lived in a house on the Plaza de Armas.

Huanchaco beach, a surfing destination, is located just north of Trujillo.

Trujillo's restaurants offer a wide variety of local food, such as shambar, mostly served on Mondays; ceviche, sopa teologa and cabrito.

Moche Route
The route covers a number of places that were part of the dominions of the Moche kingdom during its heyday.

Tourist attractions

The historic centre of Trujillo

The historic centre of Trujillo occupies an area of 133.5ha and consists of a total of 1.783 lots, grouped in 72 blocks are located within the area that was known as the "Fence Trujillo," and was originally defined by the wall of the ciudad. Currently the historic center of Trujillo is bordered by the España Avenue, it may find many buildings dating from the colonial and republican periods, between attractions offered by the historic center of Trujillo we have the following:

 Plaza de Armas (main square), is surrounded by the Cathedral, colonial mansions and Republican harmonious. In the center stands the Freedom Monument (Trujillo), which represents the process of independence. The statue was made in France, the materials used are marble and copper, the sculptor was Edmund Moeller.
 The Cathedral, built between 1647 and 1666, their altars are Baroque and Rococo style, preserved the paintings belong to the Cuzco school of painting and Quito school. The cathedral has the Cathedral Museum with mostly religious works of the colonial era gold and silver.
 Casa del Mayorazgo or Casa Tinoco (House Tinoco), built in the 16th century by the owners of the first sugar factory of Facalá. There he designed the first flag of independence in 1820, is located on a corner of Pizarro and Bolognesi streets. The main entrance is located on the Pizarro Jr. 314.
 Casa Calonge or Urquiaga, built in a neoclassical style, between the 18th and 19th centuries, Simon Bolivar stayed in this house, from which organized much of his campaign and issued decrees declaring emancipation Trujillo Capital of the Republic of Peru and creating the Superior Court of Justice. You can see the desk used by Bolivar, gold ornaments of the Chimu culture, as well as period furniture.
 Casa Ganoza, for its architecture, the house is very representative of Trujillo. The house is known for the cover of the lions as its Baroque is crowned by a pediment Rococo and two lions.
 Casa of Emancipation, This house served as headquarters of the First Constitutional Congress and government house of former President Jose de la Riva Agüero.

Archeological sites
 Chan Chan
The largest Pre-Columbian city in the Americas, was built by the Chimu, is located north of the city of Trujillo and is one of the most impressive places of Peru, UNESCO declared Chan Chan World Heritage Site in 1986.

 The Temples of the Sun and Moon

This archaeological site represented physically the capital of the Mochica culture from the 1st century AD until the 9th century, the museum is next to one of the most visited places in the northern city of Trujillo. The Temple of the Moon or Huaca de la Luna has been considered as a religious center of the mochicas.

 Huaca Esmeralda
Located three blocks from the temple of Mansiche, urbanization La Esmeralda. Consists of two platforms. The first, located at the entrance, is the last stage of construction Chimu, the decor is fishing nets with fish inside. Behind the second platform and the oldest is similar to the Tschudi Palace decorated with designs of the network and the sea otter.

 Huaca del Dragón
The Huaca del Dragon or as also called, Huaca del Arco Iris is located in the north, in the District of La Esperanza and near Chan Chan. This is a large religious monument, administrative and ceremonial center built in adobe, whose murals are decorated with friezes in relief showing stylized human figures and representing the rainbow.

 Huaca Takaynamo, it is located in La Esperanza district.

Caballito de totora
The manufacturing of ships called Caballito de totora is a tradition in Huanchaco beach. These are used for fishermen in their work and also for navigation of the tourists as a distraction adventure.

Nearby places
 Huanchaco Beach
Huanchaco is considered a World Surfing Reserve and It is located in Huanchaco District; It is a traditional tourist resort of Trujillo, one can see the rafts called horses of totora used since the time of the Chimu for fishing activities. It also highlights the fishing harbor, icon representing the place. Huanchaco is known for being a surfer's "dream spot" and for its caballitos de totora. The most famous and original food here is the ceviche.
 Countryside of Moche
The district of Moche, is traversed by the Moche River and is home to the Temples of the Sun and the Moon, that were the capital of the Moche culture, countryside centers are also where you can taste typical dishes like soup theologian, in the Moche countryside are located traditional Trujillo restaurants of the "Mochica"; honorable mention deserves the Moche urban area with its main square. The countryside is rich in tradition and history.
 Lake Conache
Lake Conache is located within a large nature reserve in the village of Conache, in the district of Laredo, has an approximate area of 9 hectares is close to the Pampas de San Juan, jurisdiction of Santo Domingo, Laredo. The big dunes that are around it, are ideal for sandboarding very close to the lagoon is a forest of carob.
 Countryside of Simbal, It is located in Simbal District.
 El Brujo, is an Archaeological Complex located about 45 km north of Trujillo, is an ancient monument of the Moche culture. It includes Huaca Prieta (from preceramic times and later extended by the Cupisnique culture) and the nearby colonial remains of Salinar, Moche, Lambayeque, Chimú. Huaca El Brujo (or Cortada/Partida) and Huaca Cao Viejo (or Huaca Blanca) were built by the Moche sometime between 1 and 600 AD. Huaca Cao Viejo is known for its polychrome reliefs and mural paintings, and the discovery of the Dama de Cao, the first known Governess in Peru.

Culture
Trujillo has always been the capital of a region whose cultural traditions dating back to at least twelve thousand years old. The existing archaeological sites like the Temple of the Sun and Moon and the city of Chan Chan demonstrate the cities vocation of cultural capital. Trujillo now emerges as a cultural capital, service center and equipment, with its universities, schools and basic technology, they are developing a comprehensive capital and a base for sustained innovations for development.

Education

Primary and secondary school
The city has more than 833 schools, 83% of schools are concentrated in urban continuum, corresponding to 50% to the district of Trujillo. The concentration of educational institutions in the district of Trujillo is primarily for the secondary level (53%) where there is a greater presence of the private sector. The expansion of state educational infrastructure and increasing participation of the private sector in education has allowed progress in educational coverage ciudad. Some primary and secondary schools most representative of the city of Trujillo are:

 National College San Juan of Trujillo, in this school in 1915 the poet César Vallejo he taught first grade to novelist Ciro Alegría.
 Seminary College San Carlos and San Marcelo,  has over 386 years of formative presence in the region, provides educational services in primary and secondary levels of males. It is considered a historic school in the country by resolution number 018-2011-ED. This school was founded on November 4, 1625, by trujillan bishop Carlos Marcelo Corne.
 Great Unity School José Faustino Sánchez Carrión, is considered one of the landmarks of the city schools.
 College Santa Rosa, located in the historic center of the city.
 College Rafael Narvaez Cadenillas, is a pilot school, part of the School of Education and Communication Sciences of the National University of Trujillo. It was founded in 1992 and located in local spaces of the UNT campus.
 Modelo College is one of the flagship schools of Trujillo. It is located on the corner of Spain and El Ejército avenues facing the Plaza Bolognesi.
 Max Ludwig Planck (School)

Universities
National University of Trujillo

Trujillo is home to many higher education institutions, including the majority of the universities and vocational institutes in northern Peru. The most recognized universities are the National University of Trujillo, one of the most important universities in Perú, which was created on May 10, 1824, by Simon Bolivar and from their classrooms graduated poets: César Vallejo who was one of the leading representatives of the North Group, Alejandro Romualdo, political philosophers: Antenor Orrego, political ideologues: Víctor Raúl Haya de la Torre(APRA), Luciano Castillo (Socialist Party of Peru), economists Luis Alva, Pacific Huaman, Cesar Liza, Jaime Verastegui, writers: Ciro Alegría, Eduardo Gonzalez Viaña.

Other well-known universities are Antenor Orrego Private University, Cesar Vallejo University, Catholic University of Trujillo, Private University of the North which belongs to Laureate International Universities (Laureate Education) being the one of two international universities in Peru, Private University of Trujillo, Leonardo Da Vinci University, Alas Peruanas University, the archdiocesan seminary, and some other regions universities established in the city.

The city also has the Regional Conservatory of Music "Carlos Valderrama" which has university status since 2011.

Other Tertiary Institutes
Among principal Institutes of Technology in the city are TECSUP, SENATI, SENCICO, Nueva Esperanza, Leonardo da Vinci and Institute of the North.  Also in the city there is the School of Arts Macedonio de la Torre founded by the painter Pedro Azabache Bustamante.

Museums and Exhibition Halls

 Museo del Juguete (Toy Museum)
Located a few blocks from the Plaza de Armas with its coffee bar is one of the most splendid of the city and unique in the country, owned by renowned painter Gerardo Chavez, here you can find toys to mid-20th-century.

 Museo de Arte Moderno (Museum of Modern Art)

Another museum belonging to the painter Gerardo Chavez, is located in the urbanization Semirustica El Bosque, the museum displays works of prominent artists, both national and foreign, and sculptures but also find a coffee bar and souvenir sales, is the first museum of modern art in Peru.

 Museo Casa de la Emancipación (Emancipation House Museum)
Is considered as a Civic Sanctuary of the city: here the Marquis Torre Tagle conceived the independence of Trujillo in 1820. Also here was Hosted the First Constitutional Congress and the Government Palace with Riva Agüero. Nowadays it hosts cultural exhibitions. It is located on the corner of Jiron Gamarra with Jiron Pizarro streets; is a traditional cultural center for excellence in Trujillo, here are art exhibitions and special ceremonies are performed in the central courtyard. With a well-restored house belonging to Banco Continental, is a must for all tourists seeking culture in Trujillo.

 Museo Huacas de Moche (Museum of Moche Temples)
Located at the foot of the Huaca de la Luna in the Moche District, this modern museum was opened in 2010 and it shows the recent archaeological discoveries of the Moche ceremonial religious center. Next to the Mochica monuments is a great touristic circuit for not stop visiting in Trujillo.

 Chan Chan Museum

The museum is located at the foot of Chan Chan, the largest mud city in Latin America are shown in the most important findings found in the Chimu city as well as studies on political and religious division.

Festivals and Events

Trujillo city has many national and international festivals. Festivals and events occurring regularly include:

 Marinera Festival
A festival of typical dance is very representative of the city, the national competition is organized by the Club Libertad and takes place the last week of January, couples of dancers from different parts of the country and the world are prepared every year for contest the top of the different categories of competition that draws thousands of tourists every year. It also highlights the marinera parade also with the participation of Peruvian paso horses and typical riders called chalanes through the main streets of the historic center.

 Trujillo Spring Festival (Spring International Festival)
Is considered by some as the most representative festival of the city that lives up to the nickname he carries. The festival is one of the most important in Peru and is done in early October of each year, by the Lions Club of La Libertad Region. The first festival was held in 1950, and has been held annually since. The flower festival has a rich and varied program of over a hundred activities to meet the tastes and interests of Trujillo people and thousands of domestic and foreign tourists. The activities are carried out for a month in which the city takes on a festive environment, thousands of domestic and foreign tourists arriving in the town for various events like the coronation of the Queen of Spring, competition horses step, the parade of foreign queens and Spring Corso through the main avenues of the city, where visitors revel in the maneuvers of the Guaripolas. The festival closes with the spring parade or corso and a private party organized by the Lions Club.

 San Jose Festival
Held in the resort of Las Delicias in the district of Moche on March 14, 15 and 16, is a feast day and it has been a tradition with a strong Spanish influence, which are enjoyed various activities for adults, youth and children, party hosts are Don Jose and Dona Josefa and Ms Maja, the event begins with the description of characters, activities, bars, flamenco dancing, etc. This festival is accompanied by a procession of the patron Saint Joseph, the fashion show, the bullfight, the parade of characters, and toromatch pamplonada in which involved several teams from other departments. Some houses are become in Spanish bars decorated with motifs like flags, grimaldas and posters.

 Contest of Peruvian Paso Horse

Trujillo is considered cradle of Peruvian paso horse and in the city there are contests organized by the Association of Breeders and Owners of Paso Horses in La Libertad, the best known and most important are The National Competition Paso Horses being done within the framework of the International Spring Festival made between September and October and in the Festival and International Competition of Marinera in January. Peruvian government has declared this kind of horses as Nation's cultural heritage.

 Trujillo Book Festival, in the year 2012 it took place the 5th edition organized by the Peruvian Chamber of Book by agreement with the Provincial Municipality of Trujillo, in the framework of the celebrations of 477 years of Spanish foundation of Trujillo. This time, it is estimated that more than 100,000 visitors attended to the "Plazuela El Recreo" to the 152 cultural and artistic activities, such as book presentations, poetry readings, tributes, lectures, shows and children's activities.
 Festival of Lyric Singing, It is an international festival that takes place in November of every year and it is a competition of singers from several countries. In 2011 took place the 15th edition of this festival. This event features singers international exponents of the lyric mainly from Americas, Asia and Europe, in addition have the presence of teachers and international pianists, It is organized by the Cultural Promotion Center of Trujillo, and it takes place in the Municipal theater of the city.
 Independence Day of Trujillo, is celebrated on December 29 of each year to commemorate the day of the proclamation of independence of Trujillo made in the Main Square in 1820 by the Marquis of Torre Tagle, It is officially declared a holiday in the entire province with many cultural and artistic activities in celebration.
 Carnival of Huanchaco

The festival took place from the early 20th century in the District of Huanchaco. District residents were emulating the famous Venetian Carnival, when, years later, the carnival was organized by the Huanchaco Club. The carnival has many activities including the crowning of the queen, surf contest, Luau party, Creativity in the Sand. The carnival parade among others, takes place in early February.

 Trujillo Ballet Festival
The International version began performing since 1977 at the Municipal Theatre with the participation of delegations from many countries of the world being well known, the national version is made with the participation of delegations representing various regions of country.

 Miss La Libertad
In April of every year, each province of the region sends a representative to contest for the 'Miss La Libertad' title. This event has been realized in various locations including historical places as the Plaza de armas, the city of Chan Chan, Huanchaco beach etc.

 Trujillo Anniversary Week is celebrated in the first week of March to commemorate the date of installation of the first council (municipality) in the city on March 5, 1535, by Francisco Pizarro. The celebrations last about 5 days and it features the presentation of various cultural events.
 Carnival of Conache, it is held each year in the traditional town of Conache, located in Laredo District at southeast of the city . It consists of several activities including the crowning of the queen, and a big celebration with the ancient drink called Chicha. The carnival is a costumbrist event and it has been held since year 1996.
 Lord of Huaman Festival
It takes place in the town of Santiago de Huamán The origin of this traditional festival dates back more than 300 years. It is a religious festival that attracts the interest of pilgrims and tourists who visit the historic temple of Santiago de Huaman. The celebration of the festival takes place from 13 to 27 May in honor of the Lord of Huaman; are made novenas, rosary and confessions offered by his faithful devotees. The celebrations also include morning and afternoon sports.

 Gastronomic festival of Trujillo, also called Sabe a Perú, it honors flagship products of kitchen trujillana like pepper of moche. In addition, also performed various art shows and dances, as marinera and tondero. Also contests are held, such as the best dishes of the fair representatives from the gastronomy of Trujillo, among participants are restaurants, kitchens rural, huariques, etc.

Gastronomy

Trujillo's gastronomy has a tasty and varied variety of dishes, in some cases ancient tradition, are prepared on the basis of fish, shellfish, seaweed, birds, livestock, land, etc., are counted in more than a hundred typical foods. The names of the dishes are almost always original and even natives. Today with the rise of Peruvian food in the city have established many institutes of gastronomy.

Among the most representative dishes include:

 Cebiche, several historical sources claim that this dish originated about 2000 years ago in the ancient Moche culture. which had its capital south of the city of Trujillo. The dish is prepared using 5 basic ingredients: fish fillet cut in chunks with lemon, onion, salt and chili or chili Moche. The dish is added to a variety of ingredients to taste, one result of this combination is mixed cebiche. Fish that can be used are very diverse and include species of both freshwater and sea, also includes other seafood such as shellfish and seaweed and even vegetables. The dish can be accompanied by products such as sweet potatoes, boiled corn, cassava, lettuce leaves, roasted corn, etc. According to historical sources Peruvian ceviche had originated first in the Moche culture on the coast of its present territory for over two thousand years. Different chronicles report that along the Peruvian coast was consumed fish with salt and chili. This dish has been declared National Cultural Heritage by the Peruvian government.
 Shambar, soup made with beans also includes smoked ham. Served with roasted corn. In restaurants traditionally served on Mondays.
 Theologian soup: broth turkey and / or chicken with soaked bread, potatoes, milk and cheese, is traditionally prepared in the district of Moche.
 Beans to the Trujillo: black beans with sesame seeds and chili mirasol.
 Pepián of turkey: turkey stew with rice, ground corn, cilantro and chili.
 Trujillo fish: steamed fish with eggs and onion sauce.
 Mollejitas to the sillao: exquisite dish served with onion salad and boiled yucc.
 The alfajores of Trujillo
In the city of Trujillo is typical the manufacturing and consumption of sweets and a series of traditional alfajores; formerly called Alfajor of Trujillo that has been manufactured by various candy stores being the best known Dulcería Castañeda, this candy store has become a traditional brand of alfajores in the city; since 1925 they have made alfajores and various giant named alfajor king kong formerly known as "Alfajor of Trujillo", "Dulcería Castañeda" currently has several locals. Its main products are their alfajores and which are requested as classics sweet souvenirs of the city of the everlasting spring.

 Drinks
Among the highlights typical drinks are chicha of Moche, made of jora; chicha of Magdalena de Cao, etc.

Music and dance

The music and dance that represents to the city is the Marinera, and the city is considered as Capital of Marinera, this dance and choreographic and musical forms in its various regional varieties, has been declared as national cultural heritage. The city has numerous dance academies where they grow this traditional dance, some since very young, also in these academies are preparing many participants from the city to the national competition of this dance held every year in January.

Transportation

The city is connected to all the main coastal cities by the Pan-American Highway.

 Trujillo International Airport
Important to the city's transportation network is the Carlos Martínez de Pinillos International Airport located in Huanchaco District northwest of Trujillo metropolitan area.

 Salaverry Port
The port town of Salaverry located at southwest Trujillo city is one of the most commercial ports of Peru. Its good linking with Trujillo and the Panamerican Highway makes the port of easy access by road to the shippers and receivers (mainly fishmeal, fertilizers, mineral concentrates, rice and sugar) located within its influence area. This port has great commercial activity due to agricultural exports. Another port town is Puerto Chicama (Puerto Malabrigo) are used for maritime connection. with the world.

 Public Transportation
According to studies by the Municipality of Trujillo in the city, it is estimated that there is a weekly demand of 29,285 passengers traveling by bus outside of Trujillo and 28,580 passengers are arriving weekly to the city by the same transportation, so that the municipality plans to build a bus station starting mid-2012. As part of the shares of the project "Sustainable Cities" that is executing the Municipality of Trujillo in agreement with the Inter-American Development Bank, It has been presented a "Plan of mobility for Trujillo ", it consists of four main projects: implementation of Segregated cycle facilities, pedestrianization of the historic center, the construction of the green ring of España avenue and the implementation of Light rail for the city.

Main avenues
 Larco Avenue is one of the main avenues of the city, named after the philanthropist Victor Larco Herrera by this via urbanistically joins Trujillo and Víctor Larco  districts. It begins in the west of the city and starts from the sector of Buenos Aires and runs to the Historic Centre of Trujillo, covers many blocks which have numerous shopping centers, of education, health, regional government agencies, etc.
 España Avenue
 America Avenue.
 César Vallejo Avenue
 Nicolás de Piérola Avenida
 Mansiche Avenue

Media
In Trujillo city are available virtually all existing communications services that can be used to transmit or exchange information permanently from public telephones and internet booths up to wireless communication networks.

Trujillo concentrates much of the entire media of the La Libertad Region, in television, radio, print and communication services through the internet and fixed and mobile telephony. There are also mail and courier service companies locally, nationally and internationally as Perú Mail Express, Serpost and others.

Newspapers
Among the newspapers published in the city of Trujillo; one of the largest circulation newspaper is La Industria, also publishes the newspaper Nuevo Norte and the evening newspaper that is called Satélite.

Telecommunication

Television channels
Trujillo is the headquarters of several television channels some with a presence in several cities in the northern region. The following table shows the TV channels based in Trujillo.

Radio
From Trujillo several stations emit their radio signal type AM and FM . Following is a table with some FM stations.

Sports

Some of the most popular sports in the city are volleyball, basketball, swimming, karate, surfing practiced mostly in Huanchaco beach, sandboarding, etc. The most popular sport and is practiced in Trujillo is soccer, now represented in the Peruvian primera division of soccer by club Carlos A. Mannucci and Cesar Vallejo University. The main sports arena in the professional league for soccer is estadio Mansiche, the main stage for volleyball is the coliseo Gran Chimu both located in the Sports complex Mansiche.

Basketball, is also a growing sport, since a BCT (Basketball Club Trujillo), UCV (Universidad Cesar Vallejo) achieved to be in semifinals of the national basketball club tournament. Last 3 years (2016, 2017, 2018) Trujillo's basketballs clubs have continue growing in level and trying to reach the group stages of the national club tournament.

Sport events
 Half Marathon La Industria, on November 25, 2012, was held the 43rd edition of this event that has as major category a distance of 21,098 km running across principal avenues of the city It is organized by the newspaper La Intustria.
 Huanchaco Longboard World Championship
The Huanchaco longboard world is a surfing competition takes place since 2010 in the El Elio Beach in Huanchaco and brings together leading surfers of several countries of the world.

 Copa Ciudad de Trujillo, is an international competition of football hosted in Trujillo, Peru since 2010. It features four teams: Trujillo's major team Universidad César Vallejo, and guest teams from Colombia (in 2010 and 2011), Ecuador (in 2010), and Peru (in 2010 and 2011). All matches are played at the Estadio Mansiche in Trujillo, the home stadium of the Universidad César Vallejo.

2013 Bolivarian Games

The Trujillo 2013 Bolivarian Games (Spanish: Juegos Bolivarianos), officially the XVII Bolivarian Games, were a major international multi-sport event that will be held from November 16–30, 2013 in Trujillo city. The commission of the Bolivarian Sports Organization (ODEBO) traveled to the city in early 2011 to make a visual inspection of its facilities, the review found that Trujillo has good conditions to develop the games, so the city will host the Bolivarian Games of 2013, confirmation of this headquarters was made public on February 7, 2011, in Rio de Janeiro. Approximately 5,000 athletes from 11 or 12 nations are expected to participate in 36 sports.

Parks and green zones
 The Mansiche Alameda, located in the historic "old entrance of Mansiche" that was part of the ancient city wall, in the historic area of the monumental center of Trujillo. The place has a set of very old trees and is the venue for cultural presentations.
 Trujillo Botanical Garden, located on America Sur Avenue near the Larco roundabout, just south of the Historic Center of Trujillo. It houses a large number of different plants of the coastal, Andes highlands and jungle regions.  This botanical garden preserves species such as "pallar mochero" (a variety of Lima Bean), several cotton varieties, and many other plants. The garden also houses a great variety of birds that have taken residence, attracted by the floral diversity.
 Swamps of Huanchaco

From this ecological reserve the ancient mochica extracted the raw material for the manufacture of the ancient Caballitos de totora used since the time of the Moche for fishing. Currently Huanchaco fishermen still use their materials from this swamps to make their ships of work.

Services to citizenship

Water supply, sanitation and energy
The public company for water supply and sanitation in the city and so La Libertad Region is SEDALIB which is formed by shareholders of municipalities of the Region. In electricity sector the company that supplies is called Hidrandina.

Notable people

 César Vallejo, poet, lived in Trujillo from 1910 to 1917.
 Antenor Orrego, first Peruvian political philosopher, lived in Trujillo from 1910 to 1940.
 Víctor Raúl Haya de la Torre, political leader who founded the American Popular Revolutionary Alliance (APRA) in 1924.

 Maria Julia Mantilla, Miss Peru World 2004, Miss World 2004
 María José Lora, Miss Grand Peru 2017, Miss Grand International 2017
 Henry Ian Cusick, Emmy-nominated actor.
 Teodoro Rivero Ayllón, writer and professor.
 Julio Cruzado Zavala, Senador, Politico, Secretario General de CTP
 Alejandro Aguilar Medina, research worker of the culture of Chimú
 Gerardo Chavez, artist of Trujillo.
 Eduardo Gonzalez Viaña, writer author of novel "Vallejo en los Infiernos".
 Pedro Azabache Bustamante, he was an Indigenist and Costumbrist painter who also founded School of fine arts Macedonio de La Torre in Trujillo.
 Gerardo Privat Dextre, fashion designer.
 Guillermo Larco Cox, engineer and politician.
 Carlos Valderrama Herrera, musician.
 Victor Larco Herrera, politician and philanthropist.
 Víctor Felipe Calderón Valeriano, a master of marinera dance.
 Carmen de Pinillos, writer, editor, translator
 Christian Cueva, Peruvian footballer
 José Carlos Fernández (Peruvian footballer), Peruvian footballer
 Envy Peru, Winner of Drag Race Holland Season 1
 Orlando Romero, professional boxer and restarateur

Sister cities
  Trujillo, Spain
  Salt Lake City, United States 
  Metepec, Mexico
  Decatur, United States 
  Trujillo, Venezuela
  Timișoara, Romania
  Trujillo, Honduras

See also

 Historic Centre of Trujillo
 Chan Chan
 Huanchaco
 Chimu
 Pacasmayo beach
 Plaza de Armas of Trujillo
 Plaza El Coliseo
 Moche
 Víctor Larco Herrera district
 Vista Alegre
 Buenos Aires
 Las Delicias beach
 Independence of Trujillo
 Wall of Trujillo
 Santiago de Huamán
 Lake Conache
 Marinera Festival
 Trujillo Spring Festival
 Wetlands of Huanchaco
 Salaverry beach
 Puerto Morín
 Virú culture
 Marcahuamachuco
 Wiracochapampa

References

External links

 Map of Trujillo (Wikimapia)
 "Huaca de la luna and Huaca del sol"
 "Huacas del Sol y de la Luna Archaeological Complex", Official Website
 Information on El Brujo Archaeological Complex
 Chan Chan World Heritage Site, UNESCO
 Chan Chan conservation project
 Website about Trujillo, Reviews, Events, Business Directory

Multimedia
 
 
 
 Gallery pictures of Trujillo by Panoramio, Includes Geographical information by various authors
 Colonial Trujillo photos

 
Populated places established in 1534
Cities in La Libertad Region
Populated places in La Libertad Region
Cities in Peru
1534 establishments in the Spanish Empire
Regional capital cities in Peru